A total of 25 red cards have been issued during Rugby World Cup tournaments since the first in 1987.  Discipline at the 2003 event could be said to be the best out of all seven tournaments to date, at least in terms of red cards, as none were issued.  Nine countries have seen at least one of their players dismissed, with Tonga and Canada both having lost three members of their team.  The position with the most red cards is flanker, with five such players leaving the field.  Two team captains have been dismissed by the referee.  There has only been 1 red card to date for 2 yellow card offenses.

Details
The first player to receive a red card was Welsh lock Huw Richards in the inaugural Rugby World Cup.  Richards punched New Zealand lock Gary Whetton and received a one-week suspension for his actions.  He therefore missed the final match of the team's World Cup – the third place playoff against Australia.  In that match Australian flanker David Codey was sent off in the fifth minute, the quickest dismissal in any Rugby World Cup.  Warned after only one minute, Codey again trampled on a Welsh player in a ruck and was told to leave the field.  The game continued and Australia lost by a point.

The 1991 Rugby World Cup saw two locks from opposing teams shown the red card.  Highly regarded Argentine Pedro Sporleder, who would go on to compete in the next three tournaments, fought with Samoan Mat Keenan and both were sent from the field.

Four players were sent off during the 1995 Rugby World Cup with three of them being dismissed in one incident.  Electrical problems at the Boet Erasmus Stadium in Port Elizabeth caused the South Africa–Canada match to be postponed by 45 minutes, adding to the tension of the last, decisive Pool A game.  With 10 minutes left the South Africans were leading 20–0 when a challenge by Pieter Hendriks on Canadian Winston Stanley sparked a fight between the two teams.  Fullback Scott Stewart charged into Hendriks and was joined by Springbok hooker James Dalton and several others.  Referee David McHugh chose to send off Dalton as well as Canadians Rod Snow and Gareth Rees, the captain.  Investigations after the match led to Hendriks and Stewart being suspended. One week earlier Tongan flanker Feleti Mahoni was caught stamping on the head of Frenchman Philippe Benetton during a ruck, resulting in an immediate dismissal and a lengthy ban.  Until that point Tonga had been making impressive progress against a French team that had been tipped to win the tournament.

The 1999 Rugby World Cup also saw four players dismissed but this time in four matches and from four teams.  The first red card went to Marika Vunibaka who had scored a try and in doing so became the only player to have been sent off after scoring points.  Dismissed in injury time at the end of the second half, the Fijian was adjudged to have head-butted a Canadian player.  Canadian flanker Dan Baugh was sent off for stamping on a Namibian player and subsequently received a four-week ban.  Ngalu Taufo'ou was sanctioned in the same way after running ten metres to punch England flanker Richard Hill.  On the same day Brendan Venter was sent off for stamping on Uruguayan Martin Panizza.

Unique amongst the seven tournaments, no players were sent off during the 48 games of the 2003 Rugby World Cup.

Two players were shown red cards for two teams at the 2007 Rugby World Cup, both on the same day.  Tongan Hale T-Pole was dismissed in the final ten minutes of the match against Samoa when he elbowed substitute Leo Lafaiali'i in the face.  He had received several warnings from the referee prior to the incident.  Namibian Jacques Nieuwenhuis received his red card after a dangerous tackle on Frenchman Sébastien Chabal.  The resultant enquiry decided that Nieuwenhuis had recklessly but not intentionally tackled Chabal around the head and gave him a one match ban.

Two players were sent off during the 2011 Rugby World Cup. Samoa's Paul Williams was reprimanded for striking a South African player but escaped a ban when it was deemed that his actions were not heavy, had no adverse effect on the game, and that there were "compelling on-field and/or off-field aggravating features". Wales captain Sam Warburton was sent off in the semi-final against France because he did not safely return a player to the floor after a tackle.  The decision was controversial with several commentators believing that it should only be a yellow card because Warburton did not drive the player into the ground.  Austin Healey was one of several current and former players who criticised the dismissal on Twitter, calling it a "most ridiculous decision".  However, the red card was upheld after the match and Warburton was given a three-week ban.  Warburton became only the second player to be dismissed in a semi-final, the latest stage towards the final that any player has received a red card.  Coincidentally, the other player, Huw Richards, was also representing Wales.

Red cards

Teams
Key

See also
Glossary of rugby union terms

References
General
 
 

'''Specific

Rugby World Cup
Rugby union records and statistics
red